Abog is a rural locality (a village) in Ust-Urolskoye Rural Settlement of Cherdynsky District, Perm Krai, Russia. The population was 17 as of 2010. There are 2 streets.

Geography 
The village is located on the right bank of Kama River, 111 km southwest of Cherdyn (the district's administrative centre) by road. Istok is the nearest rural locality.

References 

Rural localities in Cherdynsky District